Muṣaṣir (Assyrian cuneiform:  and variants, including Mutsatsir, Akkadian for Exit of the Serpent/Snake), in Urartian Ardini was an ancient city of Urartu, attested in Assyrian sources of the 9th and 8th centuries BC.

It was acquired by the Urartian King Ishpuini ca. 800 BC (see the Kelashin Stele). The city's tutelary deity was dḪaldi.

François Thureau-Dangin tentatively located it at Mudjesir, 10 km west of Topzawa. Reza Heidari, an archaeologist of the  "Cultural Heritage and Tourism Organization" of Iran's West Azarbaijan Province claims Rabat city near Sardasht, Iran as the location of Muṣaṣir. H. F. B. Lynch claimed that it was close to the modern town of Rawandiz in Iraqi Kurdistan.

Urartologist Paul Zimansky speculated that the Urartians (or at least the ruling family) may have emigrated northwest into the Lake Van region from Musasir.

Temple
The Musasir temple, built in 825 BC, was an important temple in Musasir, the holy city of Urartu.  The Temple at Musasir appears in an Assyrian bas-relief which adorned the palace of King Sargon II at Khorsabad, to commemorate his victory over "the seven kings of Urartu" in 714 BC.

(1802 - 1870) During the early 1850s, the British Assyrian Excavation Fund entered the field under William Kennett Loftus and many antiquities and accurate drawings of wall sculptures were apportioned between the British Museum and the Louvre. However, a convoy of antiquities was attacked by Arab robbers while being shipped down the Tigris River, and today lies buried somewhere in the bed of that river. That particular bas-relief was copied at its original location in the palace onto a drawing by Eugene Flandin(2) as Botta's chief artist.

During these Assyrian campaigns, Bianili (Urartu) was ruled by Sarduri and later by his son Rusa (Armenian: Հրաչյա Hrachya, according to Movses Khorenatsi) with the capital at Tushpa (Classical Armenian: Տոսպ Tosp) on the eastern shore of Lake Van. 

During Rusa I's reign (735-714 BC), Musasir was governed by a king named Urzana.

Potential locations 
Altintepe: Since 1959, the Historical Society and the Department of Antiquities have conducted excavations in the Yerznka area, west of Karin. Here at Altintepe was revealed an Urartian temple and other monuments. Only the foundations of the temple are in view. Obviously this is not the temple of Musasir as it is located far away from the concerned area.
Rabat Tepe: Recently a site excavated in Iran, which is called Rabat Tepe and located at the southwestern side of Lake Urmia, was identified as Musasir.
At a site called Gund-i Topzawa north of Erbil in Iraqi Kurdistan.

References

Further reading
Schurtz, Marshall Wheeler, "Like a Snake in Difficult Mountains: A Historical and Archaeological Analysis of the Character and Origin of the Iron Age Kingdom of Muṣaṣir", Dissertation, University of Pennsylvania, 2022

External links
 Searching for the Kingdom of Musasir - Penn Museum

Mannaeans
Urartian cities
Former populated places in Iran
1st millennium BC in Assyria